The Battle of Adré took place in Adré, Chad on 18 December 2005. The battle began when the Chadian rebel groups Rally for Democracy and Liberty (RDL) and Platform for Change, Unity, and Democracy (SCUD), allegedly backed by the government of Sudan, attacked the garrison in this city. However, Chadian loyalists, who had been forewarned by military intelligence of the attack, easily repulsed the attackers. Either seventy, one hundred, or three hundred rebels were killed, depending on reports. Governmental losses are unknown, but they lost at least one Russian-made helicopter in a collision with electric wires during the fighting, while another Mil Mi-17 helicopter was heavily damaged by rebel fire which killed at least one crew member.

On 19 December, SCUD leader Yaya Dillo Djérou said, "A few of our troops have participated in the action in Adré, but it is being led by the RDL. Yesterday we took control of the city."

References

External links 
 ¿Quién es Adre?

2005 in Chad
Battles of the Chadian Civil War (2005–2010)
Battles involving Chad
Battles in 2005